Airlie is an unincorporated community in Sweet Township, Pipestone County, Minnesota, United States. It is located near Minnesota State Highway 30 between Pipestone, Minnesota and Egan, South Dakota, one mile east of the Minnesota – South Dakota state line.

History 
Airlie was platted in 1879, and named for the Earl of Airlie. A post office was established at Airlie in 1882, and remained in operation until 1934.

References

External links 
HomeTownLocator Map of Airlie, Minnesota

Unincorporated communities in Minnesota
Unincorporated communities in Pipestone County, Minnesota